Mari Indus is a town in Mianwali District, Punjab, Pakistan, situated on bank of the Indus River near Kalabagh. It is located at 32°57 North 71°34 East and has an altitude of 206m or 679 ft.

Ancient Hindu temples
The historic village  "Mari" or "Old Mari Indus" is 2 kilometers from there, famous for its historic ruins of Hindu civilization and beautiful Hindu temples.

Railway 
Mari Indus  is the terminus railway station of Daud Khel-Mari Indus railway track. Length of Daud Khel-Mari Indus railway track is approx 9.6 KM. Two trains Mianwali Express (Mari Indus to Lahore), and Attock Passenger (Mari Indus to Attock) are available daily from there. Before 1991 it was also the terminus station of a  narrow gauge railway line which connected it with lakki Marwat, Bannu and  Tank. But now this railway line has been dismantled, but the Railway bridge is still being used as a road bridge.

Politics
There are two major political group, Syed Ulfat Hussain Shah & Khawja group.

See also
 List of Hindu temples in Pakistan

References

External links 
Wikimapia Mari-Indus
Photo of steam Locomotive was used on Mari Indus-Bannu railway line

Populated places in Mianwali District